Dexetimide (brand name Tremblex) is a piperidine anticholinergic. It is a muscarinic antagonist that is used to treat drug induced parkinsonism. Dexetimide was discovered at Janssen Pharmaceutica in 1968.

References 

Muscarinic antagonists
Piperidines
Glutarimides
Janssen Pharmaceutica
Belgian inventions